The Regional Council of Brittany is the regional legislature of the region of Brittany in France. It is composed of 83 councillors, elected in 2015, in office for six years until 2021.

Seats
By Departments
17 councillors for Côtes-d'Armor
19 councillors for Morbihan
23 councillors for Ille-et-Vilaine
24 councillors for Finistère

By coalition
List « Bretagne à gauche, Bretagne pour tous » (PS - PCF - PRG - Les Verts - UDB): 58 councillors
List « L'union pour gagner » (Union for a Popular Movement/Union for French Democracy): 25 councillors

By party

Past Regional Councils

From 2004 to 2010

From 1998 to 2004

From 1998 to 2004

From 1992 to 1998

From 1986 to 1992

Past presidents
René Pleven (1974–1976)
André Colin (1976–1978)
Raymond Marcellin (1978–1986)
Yvon Bourges (1986–1998)
Josselin de Rohan (1998–2004)
Jean-Yves Le Drian (2004-2012)
Pierrick Massiot (2012-2015)
Jean-Yves Le Drian (2015-2017)
Loïg Chesnais-Girard (2017-)

See also
2004 Brittany regional election
2004 French regional elections

References

Politics of Brittany
Brittany